Hestia is a 1979 science fiction novel by American writer C. J. Cherryh. It is an early  novel in her career, about colonists on an alien world and their interactions with the catlike natives, centering on a young engineer sent to solve the colonists' problems, and his relationship with the young native cat-woman in scanty clothing on the cover.

Major themes in this novel are the perpetuation of conflicts through mistrust and revenge, personal responsibility, and conflicts between ethics and survival. Many other characters and the world itself are not developed with as much depth as those in some of Cherryh's other early works, such as Gate of Ivrel, The Pride of Chanur, Merchanter's Luck, and The Dreamstone.  Notably, the alien cat-people in this novel are entirely different from the hani of the Chanur novels, being in temperament and culture somewhat more like housecats than lions.

Plot summary

Engineer Sam Merrit has been sent to the struggling colony planet Hestia to build a dam. Since the colony is placed in a large river valley and plagued by seasonal floods, the colonists believe that a dam is essential to enable them to escape the squalid conditions that have persisted there since the founding of the colony over a hundred years ago.

Upon arrival, Merrit finds that the reason the colony is confined to the valley and not making use of flood-safe lands is the presence of cat-like alien natives who attack anyone venturing outside the valley - but the dam will destroy the habitat of many of these natives. Pressured by the colonists to hurry the construction more than he considers safe, Merrit encounters and befriends a native woman, prompting some of the colonists to become hostile towards him as well. Merrit becomes increasingly convinced that ending the conflict with the natives would help the colony more than the dam.

References
C. J. Cherryh, Hestia, DAW Books 1979, 

1979 American novels
1979 science fiction novels
American science fiction novels
Science fiction novels by C. J. Cherryh
Books with cover art by Don Maitz
Novels about extraterrestrial life
Novels set on fictional planets
Novels set in the future
DAW Books books